The Watermen (1979) is a book published by American author James A. Michener. It is an excerpt from his larger novel, Chesapeake, which was published by Random House the same year.

1979 American novels
Novels by James A. Michener
Random House books